Perittia tucumana is a moth in the family Elachistidae. It was described by Lauri Kaila in 2000. It is found in Argentina.

References

Moths described in 2000
Elachistidae
Moths of South America
Taxa named by Lauri Kaila